Buck Creek is a small tributary of the Upper Mississippi River flowing mainly through Garnavillo and Jefferson Townnships in Clayton County, Iowa, to join the Big River at Bussey Lake, a backwater lake approximately two miles above Lock and Dam No. 10 at Guttenberg, Iowa. The Army Corps of Engineers is working to reduce erosion problems in the creek's drainage.

Clayton County maintains a  park on the creek.

Buck was so named in 1837 when a pioneer shot a deer there.

See also
List of rivers of Iowa

References

Sources
Army Corps of Engineers
Clayton County parks

Tributaries of the Mississippi River
Rivers of Clayton County, Iowa
Rivers of Iowa